Zico Luzinho Ingles Casimiro, also known as Luzinho (born September 5, 1985) is an East Timorese footballer who plays as a striker for the Timor-Leste national team.

References

External links

1985 births
Association football forwards
East Timorese footballers
East Timorese expatriate footballers
Timor-Leste international footballers
East Timorese expatriate sportspeople in Australia
Expatriate soccer players in Australia
Living people